Elwood Marter Holmes (1896–1954) was an American Major League Baseball pitcher. He played for the Philadelphia Athletics during the  season.

References

Major League Baseball pitchers
Philadelphia Athletics players
Baseball players from New Jersey
1896 births
1954 deaths
Sportspeople from Burlington County, New Jersey